Rômulo Pires (born June 6, 1983 in Ceilândia, DF) is a Brazilian male model. Romulo is of Italian and Brazilian ancestry. According to Forbes, he was the 4th most successful male model in the world in 2004/5.

Pires was working as a mechanic when a woman with a flat tire said he was attractive and had the skill for modeling. He subsequently entered a model search held by Elite Model Management of Brazil and won the first place.
However, his modeling career stalled until Karl Lagerfeld took notice of him two years later.

Before walking his first runway, Romulo was hired to appear in high-profile campaigns for Chanel and Lagerfeld Gallery. With the special attention from the designer himself, Romulo got to travel around the world and started to build on his portfolio and reputation. Ad campaigns for Gucci, Valentino, Pepe Jeans, Cavali Classic, Carolina Herrera, Christian Lacroix, Ck1, Laura Biagiotti, and Emanuel Ungaro followed.
He was on People magazine as one of sexiest men alive in 2006 and worked with Helmut Newton.
Romulo was quoted as saying that he enjoyed modeling because of its perks the job brought him. He said, "You get to travel the world, and it is always free. You get to know different places, and I have learned English and a bit of Italian and french as well." In his spare time, Romulo attends acting class and cooking class, practises birkram yoga and plays soccer.

He is married to Thaís Dos Santos, a Brazilian model based in New York City. They have a son, Roman, born in November 2016.

References

External links
 
 The Internet Fashion Database
 Romulo Pires Photos
 https://www.youtube.com/watch?v=1dKuDsiKE9I
 Rômulo Pires on Instagram

Brazilian male models
1983 births
Living people